Farsetia is a genus of flowering plants in the family Brassicaceae. 
It contains the following species:
Farsetia aegyptia Turra
Farsetia cornus-africani Jonsell
Farsetia divaricata Jonsell
Farsetia ellenbeckii Engl.
Farsetia emarginata Jonsell
Farsetia fruticans Jonsell & Thulin
 Farsetia inconspicua A.G.Mill.
Farsetia longisiliqua Decne.
Farsetia longistyla Baker
Farsetia nummularia Jonsell
Farsetia occidentalis B.L.Burtt
Farsetia pedicellata Jonsell
Farsetia robecchiana Engl.
Farsetia socotrana B.L.Burtt
Farsetia somalensis (Pax) Engl. ex Gilg & Gilg-Ben.
Farsetia spinulosa Jonsell
Farsetia stenoptera Hochst.
Farsetia stylosa R.Br.
Farsetia tenuisiliqua Jonsell
Farsetia undulicarpa Jonsell

Notes

 
Brassicaceae genera
Taxonomy articles created by Polbot